Tambor can refer to:

People
 Jeffrey Tambor (born 1944), American actor
 Tambor Williams (born 1941), American politician

Places
 Tambor, Costa Rica, a town in Costa Rica
 Tambor Airport, an airport that serves Tambor, Costa Rica
 El Tambor River, river in Guatemala

Arts
 Tambor (dance), Afro-Venezuelan music and dance
 Tambor (Tower), 1998 orchestral composition by Joan Tower
 Wat Tambor, a Separatist leader in the prequel era of the Star Wars universe

Ships
 Tambor-class submarine,  class of United States Navy submarines
 , a United States Navy submarine in commission from 1940 to 1945, lead ship of the Tambor class

See also
 Tamboor, a town in Kalghatgi Taluk, Dharwad District in Karnataka, India